The 2004 Democratic National Convention featured a variety of speakers, ranging from former presidents to rising newcomers.

Monday, July 26th

Principal speakers
 William J. Clinton, 42nd president of the United States
 James E. Carter Jr., 39th president of the United States
 Albert A. Gore Jr., 45th vice-president of the United States and 2000 Democratic Presidential candidate
 Hillary Clinton, United States senator from New York

Featured speakers
 Roberta Achtenberg, first lesbian Assistant Secretary of Housing and Urban Development
 Tammy Baldwin, United States Representative from Wisconsin
 Rosa DeLauro, United States Representative from Connecticut
 Shirley Franklin, Mayor of Atlanta
 Terry McAuliffe, Chairman of the Democratic National Committee
 Greg Meeks, United States Representative from New York
 Robert Menendez, United States Representative from New Jersey
 Lottie Shackelford, Vice Chair of the 2004 Democratic National Convention
 Stephanie Tubbs Jones, United States Representative from Ohio
 Thomas J. Vilsack, Governor of Iowa

Quotes
 "Democrats and Republicans have very different and honestly held ideas on that choices we should make, rooted in fundamentally different views of how we should meet our common challenges at home and how we should play our role in the world. Democrats want to build an America of shared responsibilities and shared opportunities and more global cooperation, acting alone only when we must. We think the role of government is to give people the tools and conditions to make the most of their lives. Republicans believe in an America run by the right people, their people, in a world in which we act unilaterally when we can, and cooperate when we have to. They think the role of government is to concentrate wealth and power in the hands of those who embrace their political, economic, and social views, leaving ordinary citizens to fend for themselves on matters like health care and retirement security. Since most Americans are not that far to the right, they have to portray us Democrats as unacceptable, lacking in strength and values. In other words, they need a divided America—but we don't." —Bill Clinton
 "Strength and wisdom are not opposing values."—Bill Clinton
 "And so I say to you and to others around the world, whether they wish us well or ill — do not underestimate us Americans. We lack neither strength nor wisdom." —Jimmy Carter
 "I'll be candid with you. I had hoped to be back here this week under different circumstances, running for reelection. But you know the old saying — you win some, you lose some. And then there's that little-known third category." —Al Gore
 "Take it from me — every vote counts. In our Democracy, every vote has power. And never forget — that power is yours.  Don't let anyone take it away or talk you into throwing it away. And let's make sure that this time every vote is counted." —Al Gore

Tuesday, July 27th

Principal speakers
 Teresa Heinz Kerry, wife of John Kerry
 Christopher Heinz, stepson of John Kerry
 Barack Obama, candidate for United States Senate from Illinois and Keynote Speaker

Featured speakers

 Carol Moseley-Braun, former United States Senator from Illinois and Democratic presidential candidate
 Robert Caro, two-time Pulitzer Prize winning author and historian
 Thomas R. Carper, United States Senator from Delaware
 Jon S. Corzine, United States Senator from New Jersey
 Thomas A. Daschle, United States Senator from South Dakota and Senate Minority Leader
 Howard Dean, former Governor of Vermont and Democratic presidential candidate
 John Dingell, United States Representative from Michigan
 Richard A. "Dick" Gephardt, United States Representative from Missouri and Democratic presidential candidate
 James P. Hoffa, President of the International Brotherhood of Teamsters
 Mike Honda, United States Representative from California
 Jesse Jackson, Former Democratic presidential candidate
 Edward M. Kennedy, United States Senator from Massachusetts
 Kwame Kilpatrick, Mayor of Detroit
 Robert Matsui, United States Representative from California
 Benjamin McKenzie, actor and political activist.
 Janet Napolitano, Governor of Arizona
 Ron Reagan, son of 40th President of the United States Ronald Reagan
 Linda Sánchez, United States Representative from California
 Christie Vilsack, wife of Tom Vilsack

Quotes
 "I’ve seen their desire to take our country back for the American people. I saw it in a college student in Pennsylvania who sold her bicycle and sent us a check for one hundred dollars with a note that said, "I sold my bicycle for democracy." I saw it in a woman from Iowa who handed me fifty dollars — all in quarters. She saved it from her monthly disability check, because she wanted to make America well again. And I saw it in the 19-year-old from Alabama who had never been involved in politics before he got in his car and drove up to Vermont, because he didn't feel like he was being heard in Washington. He was just one of so many. They learned that politics was too important to be left to the politicians. They didn't just pack their bags—they backed their hopes that we can take our country back. And you know what? We will." —Howard Dean
 "Words can be cheap in a political year, we all know that. But I'm going to borrow some familiar ones, to tell you that we need John Kerry as president — because we need a uniter, not a divider, in the White House. We need John Kerry as president because it's time to restore honor and dignity to the White House — to have a president whose whole life is a testament to his goodness and decency, to his courage under fire. We need John Kerry as president of the United States of America, because he will fight for working families, and help America to be what it ought to be." —Richard Gephardt
 "Today, more than two centuries after the embattled farmers stood and fired the shot heard "round the world", the ideals of our founders still resonate across the globe. Young people in other lands — inspired by the liberty we cherish — linked arms and sang "We Shall Overcome" when the Berlin Wall fell, when apartheid ended in South Africa, and when the courageous protests took place in Tiananmen Square. The goals of the American people are every bit as high as they were more than two hundred years ago.  If America is failing to reach them today, it's not because our ideals need replacing, it's because our President needs replacing." —Edward M. Kennedy
 "I learned something then, and I believe it still. There is a value in taking a stand whether or not anyone may be noticing and whether or not it is a risky thing to do. And if even those who are in danger can raise their lonely voices, isn't more required of all of us, in this land where liberty had her birth? In America, the true patriots are those who dare speak truth to power." —Teresa Heinz Kerry
 "I was elected mayor at age 31 because I dared mighty things for the citizens of my city." —Kwame Kilpatrick
 A twelve-year-old founder of Kidsforkerry. Org addressed the delegates.  She scolded Dick Cheney for his use of an expletive in a public remark to U.S. Senator Patrick Leahy.  "When our vice president had a disagreement with a Democratic senator, he used a really bad word.  If I said that word, I would be put in a timeout. I think he should be put in a timeout." —Ilana Wexler

Wednesday, July 28th

Principal speakers
 John Edwards, 2004 Democratic Vice Presidential candidate
 Elizabeth Edwards, wife of John Edwards
 Cate Edwards, daughter of John Edwards

Featured speakers
 Steve Brozak, Candidate for United States Representative from New Jersey and retired Marine Lieutenant Colonel
 Elijah Cummings, United States Representative from Maryland
 Harold Ford, Jr., United States Representative from Tennessee
 John Glenn, former United States Senator from Ohio and NASA astronaut
 Bob Graham, United States Senator from Florida and former Democratic presidential candidate
 Jennifer Granholm, Governor of Michigan
 Cheryl Jacques, President of Human Rights Campaign
 Claudia J. Kennedy, first female Lieutenant General in the United States Army
 Dennis Kucinich, United States Representative from Ohio
 Ed Pastor, United States Representative from Arizona
 Bill Richardson, Chairman of the 2004 Democratic National Convention and Governor of New Mexico
 Al Sharpton, Former Democratic presidential candidate

Quotes

 "My fellow Americans, I don't need to tell you that the world is a dangerous place. We are reminded of that in our everyday lives — and we have seen it on the streets and in the subways and airports outside this convention. Al Qaeda is the heir to enemies we have defeated before — today's equivalent of Nazis and fascists who hate the values at the core of the American way of life: democracy and pluralism, diversity and tolerance, innovation and achievement, strength and freedom. And the fate of Al Qaeda will be the same as those other tyrants and thugs—we will defeat them." —Bill Richardson
 "This is not about a party. It is about living up to the promise of America. The promise of America says that we will guarantee quality education for all children, and not spend more for metal detectors than computers in our schools. The promise of America guarantees health care for all of its citizens, and does not force seniors to travel to Canada to buy prescription drugs they cannot afford here. The promise of America provides that those who work in our health care system can afford to be hospitalized in the very beds that they clean everyday. The promise of America is government that does not seek to regulate your behavior in the bedroom but to guarantee your right to provide food in the kitchen. The promise of America is that we stand for human rights – whether it's fighting slavery in Sudan, AIDS in Lesotho, or police brutality in this country. The promise of America is one immigration policy for all who seek to enter our shores, whether they come from Mexico, Haiti, or Canada. The promise of America is that every citizen's vote is counted and protected, and election schemes do not decide elections." —Al Sharpton
 "As I ran for president, I hoped that one child would come out of the ghetto like I did, could look at me walk across the stage with governors and senators and know they didn't have to be a drug dealer, they didn't have to be a hoodlum, they didn't have to be a gangster.  They could stand up from a broken home, on welfare, and they could run for president of the United States." —Al Sharpton
 "There is not a liberal America, and a conservative America. There is the United States of America. There is not a black America, and a white America, a Latino America, an Asian America. There is the United States of America." —Barack Obama

Thursday, July 29th

Principal speakers
 John Kerry, 2004 Democratic Presidential Candidate
 Alexandra Kerry, Daughter of John Kerry
 Vanessa Kerry, Daughter of John Kerry

Featured speakers
 Juanita Millender-McDonald, United States Representative from California
 Joe Biden, United States Senator from Delaware
 Wesley Clark, former NATO Supreme Allied Commander and 2004 presidential candidate
 Madeleine Albright, 64th United States Secretary of State
 Max Cleland, former United States Senator from Georgia
 Joe Lieberman, United States Senator from Connecticut, 2004 presidential candidate, and 2000 vice-presidential candidate.
 Nancy Pelosi, United States Representative from California and House Minority Leader
 Byron Dorgan, United States Senator from North Dakota
 Mark Warner, Governor of Virginia

Quotes
 "During the course of this campaign, I've heard people talk about John Kerry the father and John Kerry the public servant as if they were two people divided. But, I can assure you all they are truly one and the same. I know his values-revealed in quiet 11 p.m. phone calls of frustration from what he's seen at work, or the simple reminder that we never turn our backs on those in need. What drives my father to serve is exactly what has made this public servant the father I'm proud of, look up to, and love." —Vanessa Kerry
 "To every little girl her father is a hero. It's taken some getting used to, that my father actually is one.  And not just in the obvious ways. Because he likes to listen as much as he likes to talk; because he's studious in the way someone is when everything in the whole world interests them; because he leads by example; because he trusts people with the truth and doesn't pander or play to our baser instincts." —Alexandra Kerry

Notes

References

Speakers
2004-related lists
Boston-related lists
Lists of political people
Democratic National Convention speakers